Texas Tech University College of Media & Communication (TTU CoMC) provides faculty, staff and students opportunities to study communications-related disciplines. The college is located on the sprawling Texas Tech University campus in Lubbock, Texas. TTU CoMC features seven undergraduate programs as well as a doctoral program (Ph.D. in Media & Communication) and three master's degree programs (M.A. in Mass Communication, M.A. in Communication Studies, and Online M.A. Program in Strategic Communication and Innovation).

History: Prior to 2004, the mass communications program at Texas Tech was a school within the College of Arts and Sciences. Prior to August 2012, the college was the Texas Tech University College of Mass Communications.

Academic programs 
Undergraduate Degree Programs:
 Advertising
 Communication Studies
 Creative Media Industries
 Digital Media & Professional Communication
 Journalism/Broadcast Journalism
 Media Strategies
 Public Relations
Undergraduate Certificates:
 Entertainment Media
 Game Design and Culture
 Motion Picture Production 
 Sports Media
Graduate Programs:
 Ph.D. in Media & Communication 
 M.A. in Mass Communication
 M.A. in Communication Studies
 M.A. in Strategic Communication & Innovation (Online program!)

Departments 
 Advertising & Brand Strategy
 Communication Studies
 Journalism & Creative Media Industries
 Media Strategies
 Public Relations

Research Centers 
 Center for Communication Research
 Thomas Jay Harris Institute for Hispanic & International Communication

Student Opportunities & Organizations 
 Student Opportunities & Organizations 

 Ad Team
 Association for Women in Communications (AWC)
 Communication Studies Society
 Daily Toreador
 Double T Insider
 Fashion And Media Entertainment Group
 Heads Up Display
 Hub@TTU
 Kappa Tau Alpha
 KTXT-FM 
 MCTV newscast
 Outpost Social Media Lab
 Parliamentary Debate Team
 Public Relations Student Society of America
 RaiderComm
 Raider Report
 Society of Professional Journalists
 Tech Advertising Federation
 Tech Creative Media Association
 Tech Gaming Club
 Tech Esports Association 
 TTU Women's Production Club
 Tech Virtual Reality Club

Notable people

Alumni

Faculty & Staff

References

External links
 

Educational institutions established in 2004
Mass communications
Journalism schools in the United States
2004 establishments in Texas